Miss Saint Martin and Saint Barthélemy is a French beauty pageant which selects a representative for the Miss France national competition from the overseas collectivities of Saint Martin and Saint Barthélemy. The competition was first introduced as solely Miss Saint Martin in 2012, while it became Miss Saint Martin and Barthélemy in 2016. The regional competition is typically held biennially. 

The current Miss Saint Martin and Saint Barthélemy is Inès Tessier, who was crowned Miss Saint Martin and Saint Barthélemy 2022 on 29 July 2022. No Miss Saint Martin and Saint Barthélemy titleholders have gone on to win Miss France.

Results summary
Top 12/Top 15: Layla Berry (2019)

Titleholders

Miss Saint Martin
From 2012 until 2016, the competition was titled Miss Saint Martin and only represented Saint Martin.

Notes

References

External links

Miss France regional pageants
Beauty pageants in the Collectivity of Saint Martin